The NHS Institute for Innovation and Improvement (NHS Institute) was a special health authority of the National Health Service in England.  It supported "the NHS to transform healthcare for patients and the public by rapidly developing and spreading new ways of working, new technology and world-class leadership".

Its priority programmes were originally stated as:

Safer care
Quality and value
Building capability
Commissioning
No delays
The productive series
Share and network

In its 2008/2009 work plan these were restated as:

Safer care
Delivering quality and value
Commissioning for health improvement
iLinks
Building capability for a self-improving NHS
Exploiting innovation - National Innovation Centre

The NHS Institute published papers on its research.  These are not, however, publicly available without payment.

It closed in March 2013. It was replaced by 'NHS Improving Quality', which was subsequently replaced by 'The Sustainable Improvement Team'.

NHS National Innovation Centre

The National Innovation Centre was part of the NHS Institute. Its aim was "to speed up the development of pre-commercial technologies likely to benefit the NHS".  It invited proposals for commercial or other innovation which might benefit the NHS and provided support to develop these where appropriate in the given climate. It was closed in 2013.

Innovation hubs 

The NHS network of regional NHS Innovation Hubs was set up to support NHS-funded organisations to identify and develop innovations that were in the interests of patients and society as a whole.  They did this through the activities and services of the network and by adoption of the Department of Health (United Kingdom) Guidance.
The Innovation Hubs offered legal and commercial support to NHS staff who had a pre-market product.

The NHS Innovation Hub Network worked to fulfil the following functions:

To build IP awareness in the Trusts
To find and evaluate IP for the Trusts
To protect and manage IP for the Trusts
To assist and fund technology development
To commercialise technology and products
To facilitate the dissemination of service improvements

The NHS Innovation Hub network in England consisted of the following organisations:

NHS Innovations East (Health Enterprise East)
NHS Innovations North
NHS Innovations North West (TrusTECH)
NHS Innovations South East
NHS Innovations South West
NHS Innovations West Midlands (MidTECH)
NHS Innovations Yorkshire and Humber (Medipex Ltd)

References

External links

NHS Innovation Hubs
Official website 
MEDIPEX - NHS Innovations Yorkshire and Humber
NHS Innovations North 
TrusTECH
Health Enterprise East
NHS Innovations South East
MidTech - NHS Innovations West Midlands 
NHS Innovations South West

Sources
 http://findarticles.com/p/articles/mi_qn4156/is_20060205/ai_n16048024
 http://www.devicelink.com/mdt/archive/06/10/013.html
 http://www.twanetwerk.nl/default.ashx?DocumentId=7097

Defunct National Health Service organisations
Innovation in the United Kingdom